

2000 Final results 

 2000 Progress

2001 Final results 
No documented detailed results found yet! Victor's names found on trofee.

2002 Final results  

 2002 Progress

2003 Final results  

 2003 Progress

2004 Final results  

 2004 Progress

2005 Final results  

 2005 Progress

2006 Final results  

 2006 Progress

2007 Final results  

 2007 Progress

2008 Final results  

 2008 Progress

2009 Final results  

 2009 Progress

Further results
For further results see:
 Soling North American Championship results (1969–79)
 Soling North American Championship results (1980–89)
 Soling North American Championship results (1990–99)
 Soling North American Championship results (2000–09)
 Soling North American Championship results (2010–19)
 Soling North American Championship results (2020–29)

References

Soling North American Championship